Rajotto is a Dhallywood crime action thriller film directed by Iftakar Chowdhury and produced by Fatman Films. The film stars Shakib Khan and Bobby in lead roles. The music of the film composed by Adit Ozbert. Rajotto is about a deadly journey of a gangster.

Plot
Shomrat is a local gangster, who works only with his three friends, and charges anyone doing business in his area. He gets in a fight with a bigger gangster in the city when he prevents them from charging for businesses in his area. In an ensuring shootout, Shomrat kills his all men and gets him arrested.

After a few days, his mother comes from the village to meet him and she thinks he is a police officer like his father. She gets emotional when she sees his father's motorcycle still kept with care by Shomrat. One night, his bike breaks down in middle and he parks it in the house of a local and sees Rehanna and immediately falls in love with her. Next day, when he goes to her house to take the bike, She informs that she cannot give the bike. Upon asking the reason, she denies to answer. So, he files a complaint in the police station but in vain. He then searches the local garages and hideouts of bike thieves, but too in vain. He then tries to woo Rehanna in order to know about his bike.

In the meantime, Rehanna's sister Tulona gets sick and is taken to the hospital, where it is revealed that Tulonam was raped the day Shomrat's bike had broke down, by the brother of an international gangster Juala who also stole his bike. He vows to take revenge and so he thrashes them badly and takes the rapist to the police station under a corrupt Officer in-Charge (OC), and gets him arrested. Due to this action, Rehanna falls in love with Shomrat.

Meanwhile, Juala learns about this and sends his men to kill Shomrat but are unable to do so . The OC joins hands with Juala and releases his brother. Due to this shock their father dies. Juala sends his men to kill both the sisters but is saved by Shomrat. Meanwhile, The gangster then buys the doctor who did the medical examination of Tulona and manipulates the reports. Juala's brother and son then attempt to kill Shomrat but saves himself.

The OC then discovers that Shomrat is actually ACP Wahid Murat Shomrat who works in the CID, and is in disguise as a gangster in order to finish the underworld and he informs this to Juala who thinks that Shomrat is dead. Shomrat then personally confronts the OC and the doctor and arrests and interrogates them personally. The OC informs him that they will kill his family. Juala and his son then kills Tulona and his mother and kidnaps Rehanna. In an ensuing fight Shomrat kills Juala, his son, brother and all their henchmen and unites with Rehanna

Cast
 Shakib Khan as 10% Somrat
 Bobby as Rihhana 
 Rothun
 Arefin Iqbal
 Rex Jafor as Momin
Ratan Khan as Somrat's Friend
Prabir Mitra as Rihhana's Father
Rebeka Rouf as Somrat's Mother
Zamilur Rahman Shakha
Sanko Panja
Dany Raj

Music

The soundtrack of Rajotto composed by Ozbert with the lyrics penned by Shohel Arman, Kevin Melnick & Jibon. The soundtrack features 5 tracks overall. The song "Moner Majhe" was released as a promotional single on 12 November 2013.  the video of the song "Tomake Valobashi" was released on 2 March 2014.

References

External links
 

2014 films
2014 action thriller films
2014 crime action films
2014 crime thriller films
Bengali-language Bangladeshi films
Bangladeshi action thriller films
Bangladeshi crime thriller films
Films scored by Adit Ozbert
Bangladeshi gangster films
Bangladeshi films about revenge
2010s Bengali-language films